Ortenaukreis is a Landkreis (district) in the west of Baden-Württemberg, Germany. Neighboring districts are (clockwise from north) Rastatt, Freudenstadt, Rottweil, Schwarzwald-Baar and Emmendingen. To the west it borders the French Bas-Rhin département.

History
The district was created in 1973 by merging the districts of Kehl, Lahr, Offenburg, Wolfach and the southern part of the district of Bühl.

Geography
The western part of the district is located in the Upper Rhine Valley, the eastern part belongs to the northern Black Forest. The highest elevation of the district, the Hornisgrinde (1164 m), is located in the north-east of the district. The lowest elevation (124.3 m) is in the Rhine valley to the north. The district is named after the historical territory of the Ortenau.

Partnerships
The district has a friendship with the Altenburger Land district in Thuringia. Offenburg district already had a city partnership with Altenburg so, after German reunification in 1990, Ortenaukreis chose to help modernize the Altenburger Land administration to the West German standard.

France and Germany have created the Strasbourg-Ortenau eurodistrict straddling the Rhine and combining Ortenaukreis and Greater Strasbourg, with an overall population of 950,000.

Coat of arms
The coat of arms is identical with that of the former Offenburg, and is based on the coat of arms of the Ortenau canton of the League of Imperial Knights. It shows an imperial eagle with two heads, which also stands for the free imperial cities of Offenburg, Gengenbach and Zell. In an escutcheon on the breast of the eagle is the patron Saint George, depicted killing the dragon.

Cities and municipalities

References

External links

 Official website (German)

 
Districts of Baden-Württemberg
Freiburg (region)